Dibble Creek is a stream in the U.S. state of California. The stream flows for  until it empties into the Sacramento River.

Dibble Creek has the name of Abraham Dibble, a pioneer settler.

References

Rivers of California
Rivers of Tehama County, California